Anastasia Slonova is a former Moldovan football forward, who played for Zorky Krasnogorsk in the Russian Championship. She previously played for Codru Chişinău – with whom she first played the UEFA Women's Cup in 2001, and Narta Drăsliceni in the Moldovan Championship, and Nadezhda Noginsk in Russia.

She has been a member of the currently inactive Moldovan national team.

See also
List of Moldova women's international footballers

References

1984 births
Living people
Moldovan women's footballers
Moldova women's international footballers
Expatriate women's footballers in Russia
Nadezhda Noginsk players
WFC Rossiyanka players
Women's association football forwards
FC Zorky Krasnogorsk (women) players